The family Phylliidae (often misspelled Phyllidae) contains the extant true leaf insects or walking leaves, which include some of the most remarkably camouflaged leaf mimics (mimesis) in the entire animal kingdom. They occur from South Asia through Southeast Asia to Australia. Earlier sources treat Phylliidae as a much larger taxon, containing genera in what are presently considered to be several different families.

Characteristics
Leaf insects are camouflaged, taking on the appearance of leaves. They do this so accurately that predators often are not able to distinguish them from real leaves. In some species, the edge of the leaf insect's body has the appearance of bite marks. To further confuse predators, when the leaf insect walks, it rocks back and forth, mimicking a real leaf being blown by the wind.

The scholar Antonio Pigafetta probably was the first Western person to document the creature, though it was known to people in the tropics for a long time.  Sailing with Ferdinand Magellan's circumnavigational expedition, he studied and chronicled the fauna on the island of Cimbonbon as the fleet hauled ashore for repairs. During this time he documented the Phyllium species with the following passage:

Tribes, genera and species
The subfamily Phylliinae has been divided into two tribes since 2003. This classification is not confirmed by more recent molecular genetics investigations. In addition to the fossil genus Eophyllium, the subfamily distinguishes thirteen recent genera, eight of which have been described since 2017. Within the genus Phyllium, the subgenus Pulchriphyllium, set up by Achille Griffini in 1898, has been distinguished from Phyllium since 1898. With Comptaphyllium and Walaphyllium two more subgenera became in 2019 and 2020. As of 2021, all three subgenera are considered separate genera.

Since 2021, in addition to morphological, molecular genetic studies have also increasingly been included in clarification of the phylogeny of Phylliidae. Their results show the general relationship between the genera, but when comparing female and male representatives, they do not yet provide a clear phylogenetic picture of the recent genera.

Cladograms of the Phylliidae species determined on the basis of molecular genetics analysis and morphological investigations according to Cumming and Le Tirant (2022):

The Phasmida Species File (V. 5.0) lists the following genera in two tribes:

Phylliini
Auth. 
 Chitoniscus  (Pacific)
 Chitoniscus feejeeanus 
 Chitoniscus lobipes 
 Chitoniscus lobiventris  - type species (as Phyllium lobiventre )

 Comptaphyllium  (Australasia) 
 Comptaphyllium caudatum  - type species (as Phyllium caudatum )
 Comptaphyllium regina 
 Comptaphyllium riedeli 

 Cryptophyllium  (SE Asia).Selected species: 
 Cryptophyllium athanysus 
 Cryptophyllium celebicum   - type species (as Phyllium celebicum )
 Cryptophyllium westwoodii 

 Microphyllium  (Northern Philippine Islands)
 Microphyllium haskelli 
 Microphyllium spinithorax  - type species

 Phyllium  (Sundaland, Philippine Islands, Wallacea, Australasia).Selected species:
 Phyllium bilobatum 
 Phyllium hausleithneri 
 Phyllium jacobsoni 
 Phyllium letiranti 
 Phyllium siccifolium  - type species (as Gryllus siccifolius )

 Pseudomicrophyllium  (Northern Philippine Islands)
 Pseudomicrophyllium geryon 
 Pseudomicrophyllium pusillulum  - type species (as Pseudomicrophyllium faulkneri )

 Pulchriphyllium  (Seychelles, India, Western Indonesia, continental Asia)Selected species:
 Pulchriphyllium bioculatum (
 Pulchriphyllium giganteum (
 Pulchriphyllium pulchrifolium  - type species (as Phyllium pulchrifolium )

 Rakaphyllium  (New Guinea and Ayu Islands)
 Rakaphyllium exsectum 
 Rakaphyllium schultzei  – type species (as Pulchriphyllium schultzei )

 Trolicaphyllium  (Pacific)
 Trolicaphyllium brachysoma  - type species (as Phyllium brachysoma )
 Trolicaphyllium erosus 
 Trolicaphyllium sarrameaense 

 Vaabonbonphyllium  (New Guinea and Solomon Islands)
 Vaabonbonphyllium groesseri ( – type species (as Phyllium groesseri )
 Vaabonbonphyllium rafidahae 

 Walaphyllium  (Australasia)
 Walaphyllium lelantos 
 Walaphyllium monteithi 
 Walaphyllium zomproi  - type species (as Phyllium zomproi )

Nanophylliini

Auth.  
 Acentetaphyllium  (New Guinea)
 Acentetaphyllium brevipenne  – type species (as Phyllium brevipennis )
 Acentetaphyllium larssoni 
 Acentetaphyllium miyashitai 
 Acentetaphyllium stellae 

 Nanophyllium  (Southern Indonesia, New Guinea, NE Australia)
 Nanophyllium adisi 
 Nanophyllium asekiense 
 Nanophyllium australianum 
 Nanophyllium chitoniscoides  
 Nanophyllium daphne 
 Nanophyllium frondosum 
 Nanophyllium hasenpuschi 
 Nanophyllium keyicum 
 Nanophyllium pygmaeum  – type species
 Nanophyllium rentzi 
 Nanophyllium suzukii

Captivity
Several species have gained in popularity as pets including Cryptophyllium celebicum, Cryptophyllium westwoodii, Phyllium jacobsoni, Phyllium ericoriai, Phyllium siccifolium, Phyllium letiranti, Phyllium monteithi, Phyllium philippinicum , Phyllium rubrum, Phyllium tobeloense, Pulchriphyllium bioculatum and Pulchriphyllium giganteum .

Extinct species
A 47-million-year-old fossil of Eophyllium messelensis, a prehistoric ancestor of Phylliidae, displays many of the same characteristics of modern leaf insects, indicating that this family has changed little over time.

References

External links
 
 Phasmid Study Group: Phylliidae

Phasmatodea families
 
Taxa named by Ludwig Redtenbacher

pl:Liściec